Arhopala belphoebe is a butterfly in the family Lycaenidae. It was described by William Doherty
in 1889. It is found in the Indomalayan realm (Assam and Peninsular Malaya). The subspecies A. b. cowani Corbet, 1941 is described from Malaya.

References

External links
Arhopala Boisduval, 1832 at Markku Savela's Lepidoptera and Some Other Life Forms. Retrieved June 3, 2017.

Arhopala
Butterflies described in 1889